The Minister of Multiculturalism and Citizenship was an office in the Cabinet of Canada from 1991 to 1996 and from 2013 and 2015. It was superseded in 1996 and again in 2015 by the Minister of Canadian Heritage. In 2019, Bardish Chagger was appointed as Minister of Diversity and Inclusion and Youth, taking on some of the responsibilities formerly associated with the position.

The responsibility of citizenship is now undertaken by the Minister of Immigration, Refugees and Citizenship. Prior to 1991, citizenship was within the portfolio of the Secretary of State for Canada.

Ministers

Key:

References

Multiculturalism and Citizenship
Multiculturalism in Canada

Immigration to Canada